is a video game for Nintendo's Wii video game console. It was released in Japan on December 2, 2006 as a launch title for the Wii, then in Europe on February 23, 2007 and North America on March 20, 2007.

Gameplay

Kororinpa is based on the Marble game Labyrinth but with a new twist. Instead of using little knobs on the sides to tilt the level, the player rotates the Wiimote as if they were holding the twisted pathways as opposed to a plastic piece with a sensor. There are 45 levels that increase in difficulty sequentially and eventually require some speed as well as accuracy.

In Kororinpa, the player tilts the playing field, using the Wii Remote to navigate a spherical object around mazes to reach the end goal, similar to Marble Madness, Marble Blast and the Super Monkey Ball series. Some mazes cause the player to tilt them in such a way so that a wall becomes a floor, or to interact with objects such as magnets or conveyor belts. Each level contains a number of orange crystals and a single green crystal. Collection of all orange crystals is necessary for progression, while green crystals are optional, but unlock secret levels. In addition, players may be awarded with bronze, silver, or gold trophies for completing levels within a predetermined amount of time. Obtaining these trophies unlocks new balls, music, and 5 additional bonus levels. Once the forty-five single-player levels have been completed, a mirror mode is unlocked.

Development

Reception

The game has received mixed, but predominantly positive, criticism. IGN UK awarded the game a score of 6.1 out of 10, citing the game as being "hard not to warm to", noting the "jolly soundtrack and cunning level design difficult to resist". However, they criticized the game for its lack of levels or challenge, and its "ill-conceived camera". British gaming magazines NGamer and Official Nintendo Magazine were less critical, awarding Kororinpa scores of 81 out of 100 and 80% respectively. ONM praised the game for its control method and multiplayer mode. On GameRankings, the game has received an average of 70% from 21 reviews.

Kororinpa sold only 2,416 copies on December 2, 2006, the day of the Wii launch in Japan.

Sequel
Marble Saga: Kororinpa features a plot in which the player assists a small ant named Anthony and his colony to locate the Golden Sunflower Seed. Players navigate through seventy-one stages across nine areas to Stump Temple Pieces to open the Stump Temple, the final area. Marble Saga: Kororinpa also features thirty special stages in the North American release and one hundred special stages in the European release designed for use with the Wii Balance Board controller. The game features multiplayer race modes, an edit mode for custom stage creation and sharing through Nintendo Wi-Fi Connection, and Mii integration. The game was released in North America on March 17, 2009, in Europe on May 1, 2009 and in Japan on August 6, 2009. A Nintendo 3DS follow-up was planned but never released.

References

External links
Official European Wii website 
Official Japanese Wii website 
Official Japanese i-mode website 

2006 video games
Hudson Soft games
Konami games
Nintendo games
Konami franchises
Marble games
Mobile games
Puzzle video games
Wii games
Single-player video games
Video games developed in Japan